The Oklahoma City Thunder are a professional basketball team based in Oklahoma City, Oklahoma. They play in the National Basketball Association (NBA) and are a member of the NBA Western Conference's Northwest Division. The Thunder were founded in 1967 as the Seattle SuperSonics as one of two franchises that joined the NBA in the 1967–68 season. The SuperSonics moved to Oklahoma City after the 2007–08 season.

Overall, the Thunder have qualified for the NBA playoffs on ten occasions after being relocated from Seattle (22 times as the SuperSonics). They reached the Western Conference Finals seven times, reaching the NBA Finals in 1978, 1979, 1996 and 2012, winning their only championship in the 1979 NBA Finals against the Washington Bullets whilst in Seattle.

Table key

Seasons

All-time records
Note: Statistics are correct as of the conclusion of the 2021–22 NBA season.

Notes

References
General

Specific

 
seasons